Sir Hugh Paterson, 2nd Baronet (circa 1685 – 23 March 1777) was a Scottish Jacobite and Member of the Parliament of Great Britain. 

The son of Sir Hugh Paterson, 1st Baronet by his wife Barbara, daughter of Sir William Ruthven of Dunglass and Katherine, daughter of William Douglas, 1st Marquess of Douglas, he succeeded his father as second Baronet, of Bannockburn, on 21 December 1701. From 1710 to 1715 he was Member of Parliament for Stirlingshire.

On 21 February 1712 he married Lady Jean Erskine, daughter of Charles Erskine, Earl of Mar. They had a son Henry, who predeceased his father, and a daughter, Katherine, who married John Walkinshaw.

In 1716 Paterson was attainted and his baronetcy forfeit, because, as a Jacobite, he had participated in the Jacobite Rising of 1715. His niece Clementina Walkinshaw later became the mistress of Prince Charles Edward Stuart.

References

 

1777 deaths
1680s births
Baronets in the Baronetage of Nova Scotia
Members of the Parliament of Great Britain for Scottish constituencies
British MPs 1710–1713
British MPs 1713–1715
Scottish Jacobites